Hosaramanahalli is a village located in the Mysore district of Karnataka state, India.

History 
The natives of Hosaramanahalli are the migrated families from the backwaters of Krishnarajasagara (KRS), brindavana gardens as the place got submerged while building the dam during 1911-22. Haleramanahalli near sagarkatte, has fewer families.

Location 
Hosaramanahalli is located on the banks of the Lakshmana Tirtha River and is located in the Mysore District, Hunasur Taluk, and Billikere Hobli.

Crops 
The main crops are paddy and other major crops grown here are tobacco, millet, coconut, banana, corn, and chili. Vegetables are grown locally to meet the local needs.

Population 
The population of Hosaramanahalli is about 9500 and the literacy rate is 45%. Majority of the inmates of the village are dependent on agriculture for the livelihood.

Language 
Kannada language is spoken more here & Kannada is also the official language of Hosaramanahalli.

Specials of this Place 
It holds a significant traditional fest of the tribes. Soon after the harvesting of crops and in the beginning of Harvesting season, there is Eeranneshwara Habba on the second sundays of January month. Maarikunitha is the attraction and Arvana on the day of marking of festival is enchanting. Thousands of devotees come from out of states for the festival of lord Eeranneshwara of Hosaramanahalli village. Sri Viranjaneyaswamy Temple is a famous religious place where Lord Viranjaneyaswamy is worshiped here by Vyasa Maharishi and pump irrigation system is built on the Lakshmanateertha River bank, which supplies  water to Bilikere's lake.

Transportation 
Hosaramanahalli is located at SH-57 which has state transport buses from Mysore, Krishnarajanagar and Hunsur.
The nearest airport is Mysore
The nearest railway station is Krishnarajanagara

References

Cities and towns in Mysore district